QRP  may refer to:
 QRP operation in amateur radio, low-power transmitting
 Queen retinue pheromone, a type of honey bee pheromones
 Queens Road Peckham railway station, National Rail code
 Quadratic residuosity problem in mathematics